"I'm Not Scared" is a song by Patsy Kensit's British pop band Eighth Wonder, released in February 1988 as the first single from their debut album, Fearless (1988). It achieved success in France, Italy, Switzerland, Germany and the UK, where it was a top-10 hit. Written by the Pet Shop Boys, the original version contains several words in French. "J'ai pas peur" is the French adaptation of "I'm Not Scared" and is included as the B-side to the 7-inch and 12-inch singles. The 12-inch "disco mix" combines the two versions into one long mix. Pet Shop Boys also released their own version of the song, with Neil Tennant vocals, on the album Introspective.

Slant Magazine ranked the song 62nd in its "100 Greatest Dance Songs" list in 2006.

Critical reception
Jerry Smith of Music Week considered that it was not surprising that "I'm not Scared" sounds like Pet Shop Boys and Phil Harding production, as the song was written and produced by them, noted "Kensit's distinctive, breathy vocal" and deemed the song a potential hit. James Hamilton from Record Mirror wrote in his dance column, "Patsy Kensit-lisped and French-spoken lethargic Eurobeat-ish ultimately quite haunting 0--0bpm slinker produced by the Pet Shop Boys and Phil Harding". 

William Shaw from Smash Hits felt the song "definitely bears all the hallmarks of Eurodisco — all the little insistent keyboard tunes, all the thumping bass bits, all the chattering drum machines. But where most Eurodisco records tend to be lyrically a bit daff and musically lightweight, this is a work of genius. An extremely girlie sounding Patsy Kensit strides through a city full of dogs singing a beautifully mournful melody about how she's not afraid of them, first in English, and then (just to add a touch of Euro-flavour) in French. Strange indeed, but mighty compelling."

Retrospective response
Slant Magazine ranked the song 62nd in its "100 Greatest Dance Songs" list in 2006, writing, "'I'm Not Scared' is unmistakably a Lowe/Tennant composition, with sharp staccato synth lines, a fluctuating bassline, histrionic lyrics ending in curly, figurative question marks [...], andon the extended Disco Versiondramatic string stabs".

Track listings
 7-inch single and cassette single
 "I'm Not Scared" – 3:49
 "J'ai pas peur" – 5:48

 10-inch single
 "I'm Not Scared" (10-inch remix) – 5:30
 "J'ai pas peur" – 5:48

 UK 12-inch and CD single, European mini-CD single
 "I'm Not Scared" (disco mix) – 7:58
 "I'm Not Scared" – 4:30 (album version)
 "J'ai pas peur" – 5:48

 US 12-inch single
A1. "I'm Not Scared" (long Euro mix) – 7:58
A2. "J'ai pas peur" – 5:48
B1. "I'm Not Scared" (Little Louie Vega mix) – 7:17
B2. "Baby Baby" (Dusted mix) – 6:00

 Japanese mini-CD single
 "I'm Not Scared" (disco mix) – 8:00
 "J'ai pas peur" – 5:51

Credits

Original version
 Artwork by Stylorouge
 Photography by Eamon J. McCabe
 Produced by Pet Shop Boys and Phil Harding
 Programmed by Ian Curnow
 Written by Tennant and Lowe

Little Louie Vega mix & Dub version
 Edited by Tony Moran
 Assistant: Chris Trevett
 Recording by Mike Rogers
 Remixed by Hugo Dwyer
 Keyboards by Mac Quayle
 Produced by "Little" Louie Vega

Charts

Weekly charts

Year-end charts

Cover versions

 The Pet Shop Boys included their own version of the song on their 1988 album Introspective.
 Swedish Pet Shop Boys tribute group West End Girls covered the song for their 2006 debut album Goes Petshopping.

References

1988 singles
1988 songs
CBS Records singles
Eighth Wonder songs
Number-one singles in Italy
Pet Shop Boys songs
Song recordings produced by Phil Harding (producer)
Songs written by Chris Lowe
Songs written by Neil Tennant